The Monastery of St. Anthony is a former Eastern Orthodox monastery that is part of the Meteora monastery complex in Thessaly, central Greece. It is the main monastery on Pyxari Rock.

Overview
The monastery was built around the 14th century. The main entrance of the monastery can be accessed via a paved road.

Gallery

References

Meteora